Houston We Have No Problem II – Raumschiff Schlaf Symphonie is the second part of the double album 'Housten We Have No Problem' by Nottingham-based project Twelve. Unlike Part I, Houston We Have No Problem, which was download only, Part II was released on CD only.

The title of the album, Raumschiff Schlaff Symphonie, means Space Capsule Sleep Symphonie. This album consists of one 35 minute track which is broken into 2 parts to give the impression of a side one and side two. The music was played completely live and nothing was looped, quantized, corrected or edited. Human played machine and machine manipulated human. All instruments were played by Chris Olley and Saxophone was by James Flower.

Equipment 
 Spectrasonics Atmosphere Soft Synth
 Roland Juno 6 Synthesizer
 Nord Lead I Synthesizer
 Rickenbacker Guitar
 Selmer Saxophone
 G Force M-Tron
 Fender VI Baritone Guitar
 Korg ES1 Drum Synthesizer
 Roland RE201 Space Echo

Track listing

 "Side one"
 "Side two"

Catalogue numbers
 Saturday Night Sunday Morning Records snsm019

External links
Twelve:03 Press Release
Official Twelve Page
Chris Olley's web site
Twelve's MySpace page

Chris Olley albums
2008 albums